John Oponjo Benjamin (born 29 November 1952 in Segbwema, Kailahun District, British Sierra Leone) is a Sierra Leonean economist and politician of Mende descent. He was the leader of the main opposition Sierra Leone People's Party (SLPP) to 2013. He served as Minister of Finance of Sierra Leone from 2002 to 2007. During that period, Benjamin helped lead Sierra Leone through the Paris Club's 100% debt cancellation program. Benjamin was the chairman of the Council of State Secretaries in 1992.

References

 Sierra Leone sees all debt cancelled afrol news, 24 January
 Rulers.org

1952 births
Living people
Finance ministers of Sierra Leone
Sierra Leonean economists
Sierra Leone People's Party politicians
Mende people
People from Kailahun District